Sharoe Green is a largely residential suburban area of Preston, Lancashire, England, and an electoral ward. It is nowadays usually considered to be a district of the larger suburb of Fulwood (and formed part of the pre-1974 Fulwood Urban District).  Preston golf course is within the ward boundaries, and the Royal Preston Hospital, now the sole main provider of NHS hospital treatment in the city.

Sharoe Green is a district of Preston with its near neighbour Sherwood, positioned to the far northeast of the city centre adjoining Deepdale. Its major transport links are served by the local and national bus routes criss-crossing its boundaries. The ward of Sharoe Green is a three-member electoral division, returning three councillors to Town Hall. With its neighbour Garrison, the ward forms part of the one-member Preston North East division of Lancashire County Council.

Current councillors

Demographics
At the 2001 census, the population of Sharoe Green was 6,819, with over 80% regarding themselves as Christian. At the 2008 local elections in Preston, Sharoe Green had a valid electorate of 5,103, increasing again to 6,279 at the 2011 Census.

References

Geography of Preston
Wards of Preston